The Accomac people were a historic Native American tribe in Accomack and Northampton counties in Virginia. They were loosely affiliated with the Powhatan Confederacy.

The term Accomac was eventually applied to a larger group of related Indigenous peoples living on the Eastern Shore of Virginia. To the north, the Eastern Shore of Maryland was home to the Pocomoke and related tribes, such as the Annamessex. Further north, the Assateague people lived on the Atlantic Coast of Maryland and Delaware.

History 

Their primary settlement, also called Accomac, was near present-day Cheriton, Virginia, on Cherrystone inlet in Northampton County.

Debedeavon (Accomac, died 1657) was the principal chief of the Accomac when English colonists first arrived in 1608. They called him the "Laughing King" and allied with him. In 1608, they were recorded as having 80 warriors.

By 1700, the Accomac population had declined by approximately 90 percent due to introduced diseases such as smallpox and violence from the colonists. The colonists began calling all American Indians to the immediate east of Chesapeake Bay "Accomac." They maintained communal lands through 1812, mostly in and near Accomack County.

A subgroup, the Gingaskins, lived near present-day Eastville, Virginia. They intermarried with African Americans living nearby. After the Nat Turner's slave rebellion of 1831, local White Americans forcibly expelled them from their homelands.

Subtribes 

Subtribes of the Accomac included the following groups:
 Acohanock, also written Accohannock
 Anancock, Oanancocke, Onancock
 Chiconessex, Chicconessick
 Combec
 Gingaskin, Gangascoe, Gingaskoyne,
 Kiquotank, Kikotanke
 Matchapungo, Machepungo, Mastiapungo, Matchopungo, 
 Macheteege
 Mashawatoc
 Matomkin, Matompkin, Motomkin
 Nadue, Nandewy, Nanduye
 Occoahannock
 Pungotege, Pungoteque.

Name 
Philologist James Hammond Trumbull wrote that Accomac means "the other-side place" or "on-the-other-side-of-water place." Alternative spellings include Accawmacke, Accomack, Accowmack, Acomack, and Acomak.

Cultural heritage group 
Maryland designated the Accohannock Indian Tribe as a state-recognized tribe in 2017. They claim to be descendants of the Accomac people; however, historians and other Native American tribes dispute those claims.

See also 
 Native American tribes in Virginia

Further reading 
 Helen C. Rountree. Pocahontas's People: The Powhatan Indians of Virginia Through Four Centuries. Norman: University of Oklahoma Press, 1990. .
 Weslager, Clinton Alfred. The Accomac and Accohannock Indians from Early Relations. Cape Charles: Hickory House, 2001. .

Notes

References

External links
 Gingaskin Reservation on the Eastern Shore

Algonquian ethnonyms
Eastern Algonquian peoples
Extinct Native American tribes
Indigenous peoples of the Northeastern Woodlands
Native American tribes in Virginia
Powhatan Confederacy